The 28th European Women's Artistic Gymnastics Championships held from 28 April to 2 May 2010 in Birmingham.

Timetable

Medal Winners

Detail results

Seniors

Team 

‡ Romania's Ana Porgras injured herself on her dismount on beam. However, despite injury, she still competed on bars and scored 13.7.

Vault

Uneven Bars

Balance Beam

Floor

Juniors

Team

The junior team competition also served as qualification for the all-around and individual event finals. The 8 highest-ranked teams are shown here; the other sixteen teams were Spain, Ukraine, Belgium, Sweden, Greece, Hungary, Belarus, Israel, Finland, Croatia, Czech Republic, Ireland, Austria, Norway, Turkey and Iceland.

All-Around 

Oldest and youngest competitors

Vault 

Oldest and youngest competitors

Uneven Bars 

Oldest and youngest competitors

Balance Beam 

Oldest and youngest competitors

Floor 

Oldest and youngest competitors

Medal Count

Combined

Seniors

Juniors

External links
 
 Official results (UEG-Gymnastics.com)

2010
Artistic Gymnastics
International sports competitions in Birmingham, West Midlands
European Women's Artistic Gymnastics Championships
European Women's Artistic Gymnastics Championships
European Women's Artistic Gymnastics Championships
European Women's Artistic Gymnastics Championships
2010s in Birmingham, West Midlands
European Women's Artistic Gymnastics Championships
European Women's Artistic Gymnastics Championships